Leandro Joaquim Ribeiro (born 13 January 1995) is a Brazilian footballer who plays as a striker for Daejeon Hana Citizen of K League 2.

Club career
Leandro Ribeiro is a youth product from Sport Club Internacional. He made his Série A debut at 29 May 2014 against Chapecoence.

In January 2017, Leandro Ribeiro signed for Dila Gori on a contract until the end of the 2017 season.

On 14 July 2017, Leandro Ribeiro was loaned to Maccabi Netanya for one season with option for three years.

Sheriff Tiraspol announced the signing of Leandro Ribeiro on 21 December 2018, with Leandro leaving the club at the end of the 2019 season after winning the 2019 Moldovan National Division and 2018–19 Moldovan Cup.

On 10 January 2020, Leandro was loaned to Seoul E-Land FC of K League 2. However, in July 2020, he made a three and a half year contract with the team.

In 2022, Leandro Ribeiro moved to Daejeon Hana Citizen of K League 2.

Honours
Sheriff Tiraspol
Divizia Națională: 2019
Moldovan Cup: 2018–19

References

External links

Living people
1995 births
Brazilian footballers
Brazilian expatriate footballers
Association football forwards
Sport Club Internacional players
F.C. Arouca players
FC Dila Gori players
Maccabi Netanya F.C. players
FC Sheriff Tiraspol players
Campeonato Brasileiro Série A players
Primeira Liga players
Erovnuli Liga players
Seoul E-Land FC players
Daejeon Hana Citizen FC players
Israeli Premier League players
Moldovan Super Liga players
K League 2 players
K League 1 players
Expatriate footballers in Portugal
Expatriate footballers in Georgia (country)
Expatriate footballers in Israel
Expatriate footballers in Moldova
Expatriate footballers in South Korea
Brazilian expatriate sportspeople in Portugal
Brazilian expatriate sportspeople in Georgia (country)
Brazilian expatriate sportspeople in Israel
Brazilian expatriate sportspeople in Moldova
Brazilian expatriate sportspeople in South Korea
Footballers from Rio de Janeiro (city)